Yuriy Laptikov is a Soviet sprint canoer who competed in the early 1980s. He won two medals at the ICF Canoe Sprint World Championships with a silver (C-2 500 m: 1982) and a bronze (C-2 10000 m: 1983).

References

Living people
Soviet male canoeists
Year of birth missing (living people)
ICF Canoe Sprint World Championships medalists in Canadian